Jatun Lluqhi (Quechua jatun big, lluqhi landslide, "big landslide", also spelled Jatun Lluqui) is a  mountain in the Bolivian Andes. It is located in the Potosí Department, Chayanta Province, Ravelo Municipality.

References 

Mountains of Potosí Department